The Karluks (also Qarluqs, Qarluks, Karluqs, Qarluq, Para-Mongol: Harluut,  Géluólù ; customary phonetic: Gelu, Khololo, Khorlo, Khallokh,   Qarluq) were a prominent nomadic Turkic tribal confederacy residing in the regions of Kara-Irtysh (Black Irtysh) and the Tarbagatai Mountains west of the Altay Mountains in Central Asia. Karluks gave their name to the distinct Karluk group of the Turkic languages, which also includes the Uyghur, Uzbek and Ili Turki languages.

Karluks were known as a coherent ethnic group with autonomous status within the Göktürk khaganate and the independent states of the Karluk yabghu, Karakhanids and Qarlughids before being absorbed in the Chagatai Khanate of the Mongol empire.

They were also called Uch-Oghuz meaning "Three Oghuz". Despite the similarity of names, Mahmud al-Kashgari's Dīwān Lughāt al-Turk wrote: "Karluks is a division of nomadic Turks. They are separate from Oghuz, but they are Turkmens like Oghuz.". Ilhanate's Rashid-al-Din Hamadani in his Jami' al-tawarikh mentions Karluks as one of the Oghuz (Turkmen) tribes. Kafesoğlu (1958) proposes that Türkmen might be the Karluks' equivalent of the Göktürks' political term Kök Türk.

Etymology
Nikolai Aristov noted that a tributary of the Charysh River was Kerlyk and proposed that the tribal name originated from the toponym with a Turkic meaning of "wild Siberian millet".

Peter Golden, citing Németh, suggests that qarluğ/qarluq possibly means "snowy" (from Proto-Turkic *qar "snow"). However, Marcel Erdal critiques this as a folk etymology, as "[i]n Old Turkic the suffix +lXk, which is implied in this account, had fourfold vowel harmony, and the +lXk derivate from kar would in Old Turkic be *karlık and not karluk".

Having noted that the majority of Chinese transcriptions 歌邏祿, 歌羅祿, 葛邏祿, 葛羅祿 and 哥邏祿 (all romanized as Geluolu) are trisyllabic, while only one form 葛祿 (Gelu) is disyllabic, Erdal contends that although the latter one transcribed Qarluq, the former four transcribed *Qaraluq, which should be the preferred reading. Thus, Erdal concluded that "the name is likely to be an exonym, formed as an -(O)k derivate from the verb kar-ıl- ‘to mingle (intr.)’ discussed in Erdal (1991: 662); it would thus have signified ‘the mingled ones’, presumably because the tribe evolved from the mingling of discrete groups," as already suggested by Doerfer.

History

Early history

The first Chinese reference to the Karluks (644) labels them with a Manichaean attribute: Lion Karluks ("Shi-Geluolu", "shi" stands for Sogdian "lion"). The "lion" Karluks persisted up to the time of the Mongols.

In the Early Middle Age, three member tribes of the Göktürk Kaganate formed the Uch-Karluk (Three Karluks) union; initially, the union's leader bore the title Elteber, later elevated to Yabgu. After the split of the Khaganate around 600 into the Western and Eastern Khaganates, the Uch-Karluks (三姓葛邏祿), along with Chuyue (處月; later as Shatuo 沙陀), Chumi (處蜜), Gusu (姑蘇), and Beishi (卑失) became subordinate to the Western Turkic Khaganate. After the Göktürks' downfall, the Karluk confederation would later incorporate other Turkic tribes like the Chigils, Tuhsi, Azkishi, Türgesh, Khalajes, Čaruk, Barsqan, as well as Iranian Sogdians and West Asian and Central Asian migrants.

In 630, Ashina Helu, the Ishbara Qaghan of the Eastern Turkic Kaganate, was captured by the Chinese. His heir apparent, the "lesser Khan" Hubo, escaped to Altai with a major part of the people and 30,000 soldiers. He conquered the Karluks in the west, the Kyrgyz in the north, and took the title Yizhuchebi Khagan. The Karluks allied with the Tiele and their leaders the Uyghurs against the Turkic Kaganate, and participated in enthroning the victorious head of the Uyghur (Toquz Oghuz). After that, a smaller part of the Karluks joined the Uyghurs and settled in the Bogdo-Ola mountains in Mongolia, the larger part settled in the area between Altai and the eastern Tien Shan.

In 650, at the time of their submission to the Chinese, the Karluks had three tribes: Mouluo 謀落/Moula 謀剌 (*Bulaq), Chisi 熾俟 or Suofu 娑匐 (*Sebeg), and Tashili 踏實力 (*Taşlïq). On paper, the Karluk divisions received Chinese names as Chinese provinces, and their leaders received Chinese state titles. Later, the Karluks spread from the valley of the river Kerlyk along the Irtysh River in the western part of the Altay to beyond the Black Irtysh, Tarbagatai, and towards the Tien Shan.

By the year 665 the Karluk union was led by a former Uch-Karluk bey with the title Kül-Erkin, now titled "Yabgu" (prince), who had a powerful army. The Karluk vanguard left the Altay region and at the beginning of the 8th century reached the banks of the Amu Darya.

Famed for their woven carpets in the pre-Muslim era, they were considered a vassal state by the Tang Dynasty after the final conquest of the Transoxania regions by the Chinese in 739. The Karluk rose in rebellion against the Göktürk, then the dominant tribal confederation in the region, in about 745, and established a new tribal confederation with the Uygur and Basmyl tribes. However, Karluks and Basmyls were defeated and forcibly incorporated into the Toquz Oghuz tribal confederation, led by the Uyghur Yaglakar clan.  They remained in the Chinese sphere of influence and an active participant in fighting the Muslim expansion into the area, up until their split from the Tang in 751. Chinese intervention in the affairs of Western Turkestan ceased after their defeat at the Battle of Talas in 751 by the Arab general Ziyad ibn Salih. The Arabs dislodged the Karluks from Fergana.

In 766, after they overran the Turgesh in Zhetysu, the Karluk tribes formed a Khanate under the rule of a Yabgu, occupied Suyab and transferred their capital there. By that time the bulk of the tribe had left the Altai, and the supremacy in Zhetysu passed to the Karluks. Their ruler with the title Yabgu is often mentioned in the Orkhon inscriptions. In Pahlavi texts one of the Karluk rulers of Tocharistan was called Yabbu-Hakan (Yabgu-Kagan). The fall of the Western Turkic Kaganate left Zhetysu in the possession of Turkic peoples, independent of either Arabs or Chinese.

In 822, the Uyghurs sent four Karluks as tribute to Tang dynasty China.

Culture
The Karluks were hunters, nomadic herdsmen, and agriculturists. They settled in the countryside and in the cities, which were centered on trading posts along the caravan roads. The Karluks inherited a vast multi-ethnic region, whose diverse population was not much different from its rulers. Zhetysu was populated by several tribes: the Azes (mentioned in the Orkhon inscriptions) and the Tuhsi, remnants of the Türgesh;<ref>Gumilyov, L. Searches for an Imaginary Kingdom: The trefoil of the Bird's Eye View' Ch. 5: The Shattered Silence (961-1100)</ref> as well as the Shatuo Turks (沙陀突厥) (lit. "Sandy Slope Turks", i.e. "Desert Turks") of Western Turkic,  specifically Chigil origins, and the interspersing Sogdian colonies. The southern part of Zhetysu was occupied by the Yagma people, who also held Kashgar. In the north and west lived the Kankalis. Chigils, who had joined and been a significant division of the Three-Karluks, then detached and resided around Issyk Kul.

The diverse population adhered to a spectrum of religious beliefs. Chigils were Christians of the Nestorian denomination. The majority of the Toquz Oghuz, with their khan, were Manicheans, but there were also Christians, Buddhists, and Muslims among them. The peaceful penetration of Muslim culture through commercial relations played a far more important role in their conversion than Muslim arms. The merchants were followed by missionaries of various creeds, including Nestorian Christians. Many Turkestan towns had Christian churches. The Turks held sacred the Qastek pass mountains, believing to be an abode of the deity. Each creed carried its script, resulting in a variety of used scripts, including Türkic runiform, Sogdian, Syriac, and later the Uygur. The Karluks had adopted and developed the Turkic literary language of Khoresm, established in Bukhara and Samarkand, which after Mongol conquest became known as the Chagatai language.

Of all Turkic peoples, the Karluk were most open to the influence of Muslim culture. Yaqubi reported the conversion of the Karluk-yabgu to Islam under Caliph Mahdi (775–785), and by the 10th century, several towns to the east of Talas had mosques. Muslim culture had affected the general way of life of the Karluks.

During the next three centuries, the Karluk Yabgu state occupied a key position on the choice international trade route, fighting off mostly Turkic competitors to retain their prime position. Their biggest adversaries were Kangars in the north-west and Toquz Oghuz in the south-east, with a period of Samanid raids to Zhetysu in 840–894. But even in the heyday of the Karluk Yabgu state, parts of its domains were in the hands of the Toquz Oghuz, and later under Kyrgyz and Khitan control, increasing the ethnical, religious, and political diversity.

Social organization
The state of Karluk Yabgu was an association of semi-independent districts and cities, each equipped with its own militia. The biggest was the capital Suyab, which could turn out 20,000 warriors, and among other districts, the town of Beglilig (known as "Samakna" before Karluk rule) had 10,000 warriors, Panjikat could turn out 8,000 warriors, Barskhan 6,000 warriors, and Yar 3,000 warriors. The titles of the petty rulers were Qutegin of the Karluk Laban clan in Karminkat, Taksin in Jil, Tabin-Barskhan in Barskhan, Turkic Yindl-Tegin and Sogdian Badan-Sangu in Beglilig. The prince of Suyab, situated north of the Chu river in the Turgesh land, was a brother of one of the Göktürk khans, but bore the Persian title Yalan-shah, i.e. "King of Heroes".

Muslim authors describe in detail the trade route from Western Asia to China across Zhetysu, mentioning many cities. Some bore double names, both Turkic and Sogdian. They wrote about the capital cities of Balasagun, Suyab, and Kayalik, in which William of Rubruck saw three Buddhist temples in the Muslim town for the first time. The geographers also mentioned Taraz (Talas, Auliya-ata), Navekat (now Karabulak), Atbash (now Koshoy-Kurgan ruins), Issyk-kul, Barskhan, Panjikat, Akhsikat, Beglilig, Almalik, Jul, Yar, Ton, Panchul, and others.

Kirghiz period
Prior to the Kirghiz-Uyghur war of 829–840, the Kirghiz lived in the upper basin of the Yenisei River. Linguistically their language, together with the Altai language, belongs to a separate Kirghiz group of the Turkic language family. At that time they had an estimated population of 250,000 and an army of 50,000. Kirghiz victory in the war brought them to the Karluk door.  They captured Tuva, Altai, a part of Dzungaria, and reached Kashgar. Allied with the Karluks against the Uygurs, in the 840s the Kirghiz started the occupation of that part of Zhetysu which is their present home. Karluk independence ended around 840. They fell from dominating the tribal association to a subordinate position. The Kirghiz remained a power in Zhetysu until their destruction by the Kara-Khitans in 1124, when most of them evacuated from their center in Tuva back to the Minusinsk Depression, leaving the Karluks to predominate again in Zhetysu.

The position of the Karluk state, based on the rich Zhetysu cities, remained strong, despite the failures in wars in the beginning of the 9th century. Yabgu was enriched by profitable trade in slaves on the Syr-Darya slave markets, selling guards for the Abbasid Caliphs, and control over the transit road to China in the sector from Taraz to Issyk Kul. The Karluk position in Fergana, despite Arab attempts to expel them, became stronger.

The fall of the last Kagan with its capital in Ötüken, which dominated for three centuries, created a completely new geopolitical situation in all Central Asia. For the first time in three hundred years, the powerful center of authority that created opportunities for expansion or even existence of any state in Turkestan had finally disappeared. Henceforth, the Turkic tribes recognized only the high status of the clan that inherited the Kagan title, but never again his unifying authority. Several Muslim historians state that after the loss by the Uygurs of their power (840), the supreme authority among the Turkic tribes passed to the Karluk leaders. Connection with the Ashina clan, the ruling clan of the Turkic Kaganate, allowed the Karluk dynasty to dress their authority with legitimate attire, and, abandoning the old title Yabgu, to take on the new title of Kagan.

Karakhanid period

Towards 940 the "heathen” Yagma from the southern border seized the Chu valley and the Karluk capital Balasagun. The Yagma ruler bore the title Bogra-khan (Camel Khan), very common among Karakhanids. The Yagma quickly proceeded to take control of all Karluk lands. In the 10th and 12th centuries, the lands on both sides of the principal chain of the Tian Shan were united under the rule of the Karakhanid Ilek-khans (Khans of the Land) or simply Karakhanids (Great Khans). The Karakhanid state was divided into fiefs which soon became independent.

The Kara-Khanid Khanate was founded in the 9th century from a confederation of Karluks, Chigils, Yagmas, and other tribes.  Later in the 10th century a Karakhanid Sultan Satuq Bughra Khan converted to Islam. His son Musa made Islam a state religion in 960. The empire occupied modern northern Iran and parts of Central Asia. This region remained under Karakhanid, and for varying periods it remained an independent vassal of Seljuk and Kara-Khitan. The Karakhanid khanate ended when the last ruler of its western Khanate was killed by the Khwarezmids in 1212.  Both the Kara-Khitans and the Khwarezmids were later destroyed by the Mongol invasion.

The name Khāqāniyya was given to the Qarluks who inhabited Kāshghar and Bālāsāghūn, the inhabitants were not Uighur however their language has been retroactively labelled as Uighur by scholars.

Khitan period

At the beginning of the 10th century, a tribe related to the Mongols, the Khitans with an admixture of Mongols, founded a vast empire, stretching from the Pacific to Lake Baikal and the Tian Shan, displacing the Turkic population. The Khitan language has been classified as para-Mongolic: distantly related to the Mongolic languages of the Mongols. Reportedly, the first Gurkhan was a Manichaean.

Owing to its long sway over China, the ruling dynasty, which the Twenty-Four Histories call the Liao dynasty (916–1125), was strongly influenced by Chinese culture. In 1125, a Tungusic people, the Jurchen, allied with the Southern Song, ending the domination of the Khitan. The Khitan exiles, headed by Yelü Dashi, a member of the Khitan royal family, migrated to the West. The Khitan settled in the Tarbagatai Mountains east of Zhetysu, and their number grew to 40,000 tents.

Around 1130 the local Karakhanid ruler of Balasagun asked for their aid against the hostile Kankalis and Karluks. The Khitan occupied Balasaghun, expelled the weak Karakhanid ruler, and founded their own state, which stretched from the Yenisei to Taraz. They then conquered Kankali and subdued Xinjiang. In 1137 near Khujand they defeated the Transoxanian Karakhanid ruler Mahmud Khan, who then appealed to their suzerain the Seljuks for help. The Kara-Khitans, who were also invited by the Khwarazmians (then also a vassal of the Seljuks) to conquer the lands of the Seljuks as well as in response to an appeal to intervene by the Karluks who were involved in a conflict with the Karakhanids, then advanced to Samarkand.  In 1141, the Seljuks under Ahmad Sanjar also arrived in Samarkand with his army, but was defeated by the Kara-Khitans in the Battle of Qatwan, after which the Kara-Khitans became dominant in Transoxania.

The western Khitan state became known under its Turkic name, the Kara-Khitan Khanate and their ruler bore the Turkic title Gurkhan "Khan’s son-in law". The original Uch-Karluk confederation became split between the Karakhanid state in the west and the Karakhitay state in the east, lasting until the Mongol invasion. Both in the west and east, Karluk principalities retained their autonomous status and indigenous rulers, though in Karakhitay the Karluk khan, like the ruler of Samarkand, was forced to accept the presence of a permanent representative of the Gurkhan.

The Gurkhans administered limited territories, populated in 1170 by 84,500 families under direct rule. The Gurkhan's headquarters was called Khosun-ordu (lit. "Strong Ordu"), or Khoto ("House"). The Karluk capital was Kayalik. The Karakhanids continued to rule over Transoxania and western Xinjiang. The Kara-khitans did not interfere with the religion of the people, but Islam became less dominant as the other religions took advantage of the new freedom to increase the number of their adherents. The Nestorian Patriarch Elias III (1176–1190) founded a religious metropole in Kashgar. The Karakhitay metropolitan bore the title Metropolitan of Kashghar and Navakat, showing that the see of Kashghar also controlled the southern part of Zhetysu. The oldest Nestorian tombs in the Tokmak and Pishpek cemeteries go back to the epoch of Karakhitay domination. Ata-Malik Juvayni however stressed the oppression of Muslims by Kuchlug, a son of the last Nayman khan who was ousted (towards 1204) by Mongolia by Genghis Khan. The Nayman Nestorian Christian Küchlük usurped the throne of the Kara-Khitans.  In 1211, a Mongol detachment under the command of Khubilai Noyon, one of Genghis Khan's generals, appeared in the northern part of Zhetysu. Arslan-khan Karluk killed the Karakhitay governor of Kayalik and proclaimed his loyalty to Genghis Khan. The Zhetysu, together with Eastern Turkestan, voluntarily surrendered to the Mongols.  Kuchlug was killed by the invading Mongols in 1218.

 Mongol era 
In the 1211 a Mongol detachment under command of Khubilai noyon, one of Genghis Khan's generals, appeared in the northern part of Zhetysu. Arslan Khan Karluk, probably the son of Arslan khan and brother of Mamdu khan, killed the Khitan governor of Kayalik and proclaimed his loyalty to Genghis Khan. The Collection of Annals records that Genghis Khan removed his title from Karluk Arslan Khan: "Let your name be Sartaktai", i.e. Sart, said the sovereign.

After the absorption of the Kara-Khanid Khanate by the Chagatai Khanate, the ethnonym Karluk became rarely used. The Karluk language was the primary basis for the later lingua-franca of the Chagatai Khanate and Central Asia under the Timurid dynasty. It is therefore designated by linguists and historians as the Chagatai language, but its contemporaries, such as Timur and Babur, simply called it Turki.

Modern period
In the 20th century, the geopolitical Great Game among great powers demanded the creation of modern nationalities among Central Asian Turks. The ethnonym "Karluk" was not revived. Instead, Uzbek and Uyghur became the two major divisions among speakers of modern variants of the Chagatai language. Under these two modern nationalities, there are subgroups like the Uyghur Dolan, Aynur and several regional populations of Uzbeks. Some of the Uzbeks share more similarities with Kipchak groups like the Karakalpak and Kazakhs, or with the Iranian Tajiks, than with fellow Uzbeks who speak a descendant of the Karluk language.

In Turkmenistan, the Karluks are part of the Arabachy ethnographic group of Turkmens living in the Garlyk etrap (named after the tribe) of the Lebap velayat.

Genetics

A genetic study published in Nature in May 2018 examined the remains of two Karluk males buried at Butakty in the Tian Shan between 800 AD and 1000 AD.  One male carried the paternal haplogroup J2a  and the maternal haplogroup A, while the other carried the maternal haplogroup F1b1e.

Physical appearance
Arab historian Al Masudi stated that, among Turkic peoples, the Karluks were "the most beautiful in form, the tallest in stature and the most lordly in appearance".

See also
Hazara-i-Karlugh
Qarlughids
Bulaqs

Notes

References

Sources

 Z. V. Togan: The Origins of the Kazaks and the ôzbeks'', H.B. Paksoy, IUE.it, webpage:  IUE-5.

Nomadic groups in Eurasia
Ethnic groups in Chinese history
Turkic peoples of Asia